The Wendouree Centre for the Performing Arts (WCPA) is a performing arts centre in Wendouree, a suburb of Ballarat, Victoria. The WCPA was completed mid-2006 and replaced the Timkin Hall. It was built at an estimated cost of $8 million. The main auditorium can seat 857 people.

External links
Wendouree Centre for the Performing Arts website

Buildings and structures in Ballarat
Performing arts centres in Australia
Tourist attractions in Victoria (Australia)